Joseph Gregory Erardi (born May 31, 1954) is a former Major League Baseball right-handed pitcher.

Greg Erardi attended Liverpool High School in Liverpool, New York and Christian Brothers Academy in DeWitt, New York, and was selected by the Milwaukee Brewers in the 24th round of the 1972 Major League Baseball Draft. The Brewers traded Erardi to the Pittsburgh Pirates in September 1973 for pitcher Lafayette Currence, who wound up pitching for the 1975 Milwaukee Brewers. Erardi was released by the Pirates organization in June, 1975 and was re-signed by the Brewers organization. In November 1976, the Seattle Mariners made Erardi the 60th pick in the 1976 expansion draft.

Erardi would make his Major League Baseball debut with the Seattle Mariners during the Mariners' inaugural season on September 6, retiring all three Kansas City Royals he faced to end a game lost by the Mariners 10-0. He pitched in a total of five games, all in relief. The Mariners released him after he spent the 1978 season in AAA. Erardi took classes at New York University in his baseball off-seasons and finished his undergraduate degree before retiring from baseball. He finished an MBA degree from the Wharton School of Business and went on to become Managing Director of Salomon Brothers.

References

External links

1954 births
Living people
Baseball players from Syracuse, New York
Berkshire Brewers players
Charleston Pirates players
Holyoke Millers players
Major League Baseball pitchers
Newark Co-Pilots players
Salem Pirates players
Seattle Mariners players
Spokane Indians players
Thetford Mines Miners players
Wharton School of the University of Pennsylvania alumni
West Haven Yankees players
Liverpool High School alumni